Susanna Rajamäki (born 19 September 1979) is a Finnish athlete. She competed in the women's heptathlon at the 2000 Summer Olympics.

References

External links
 

1979 births
Living people
Athletes (track and field) at the 2000 Summer Olympics
Finnish heptathletes
Olympic athletes of Finland
Sportspeople from South Ostrobothnia